Helen Vinson (born Helen Rulfs, September 17, 1907 – October 7, 1999) was an American film actress who appeared in 40 films between 1932 and 1945.

Early life 
Vinson was born in Beaumont, Texas, the daughter of oil man Edward Rulfs. She developed a passion for horses during her youth. She studied at the University of Texas at Austin.

Theater 
In Austin, she met March Culmore, director of the Little Theater in Houston, Texas. Culmore took her as a pupil and she was soon playing lead roles with the theater. From Texas, she moved quickly to Broadway, where her credits included Los Angeles (1927), Death Takes a Holiday (1931), Berlin (1931), and The Fatal Alibi (1932). A succession of performances followed and led to a contract with Warner Bros. Later, she regretted her quick leap to Hollywood and motion pictures, saying, "If I'd stayed in New York longer, I'd be getting a much bigger salary out here now."

Film career 

Vinson's pre-Code screen roles often featured her as the 'other' woman with an active romantic life. Her first film role was Jewel Robbery (1932), which starred William Powell and Kay Francis. She appeared as Doris Delafield in The Kennel Murder Case, starring Powell as Philo Vance. One of her memorable roles was in The Wedding Night (1935), when she played the wife of Gary Cooper's character and the rival of Anna Sten, in a story about the Connecticut tobacco fields. In the RKO film In Name Only (1939), she was cast as the treacherous friend of Carole Lombard, Kay Francis and Cary Grant's characters. She played an undercover federal agent posing as a femme fatale opposite Richard Cromwell in the anti-Nazi drama Enemy Agent (1940). She followed that role with that of Helen Draque in The Thin Man Goes Home.

Vinson's film career ended in 1945. For her contribution to the motion picture industry, she has a star on the Hollywood Walk of Fame at 1560 Vine Street.

Private life and death 
Vinson married Harry Nelson Vickerman, a carpet manufacturer, in Houston, Texas, in May 1925. They divorced on February 7, 1934.

In 1935, she married Fred Perry, a British tennis champion. They lived in England before moving to Hollywood. They divorced in 1938, after which she married Donald Hardenbrook, a "wealthy New York socialite".

Away from film-making and following her retirement, Vinson made frequent trips to New York City to see Broadway shows, visited friends in her home state of Texas, and enjoyed the Mardi Gras in New Orleans. She loved horses and had a private mount named Arrabella.

Helen Vinson died in Chapel Hill, North Carolina in 1999, aged 92.

Filmography 

 Jewel Robbery (1932) – Marianne
 Two Against the World (1932) – Corinne Walton
 The Crash (1932) – Esther Parrish (uncredited)
 They Call It Sin (1932) – Enid Hollister
 I Am a Fugitive from a Chain Gang (1932) – Helen
 Lawyer Man (1932) – Barbara Bentley
 Second Hand Wife (1933) – Betty Cavendish
 Grand Slam (1933) – Lola Starr
 The Little Giant (1933) – Polly Cass
 Midnight Club (1933) – Iris Whitney
 The Power and the Glory (1933) – Eve Borden
 The Kennel Murder Case (1933) – Doris Delafield
 As Husbands Go (1934) – Lucille Lingard
 The Life of Vergie Winters (1934) – Laura Shadwell
 Let's Try Again (1934) – Ann (Credits) / Nan Blake
 Gift of Gab (1934) – Nurse
 The Captain Hates the Sea (1934) – Janet Grayson
 Broadway Bill (1934) – Margaret
 A Notorious Gentleman (1935) – Nina Thorne
 The Wedding Night (1935) – Dora Barrett
 Private Worlds (1935) – Claire Monet
 Age of Indiscretion (1935) – Eve Lenhart
 The Tunnel (1935) – Varlia Lloyd
 King of the Damned (1935) – Anna Courvin
 Love in Exile (1936) – Countess Xandra St. Aurion
 Reunion (1936) – Gloria Sheridan
 Vogues of 1938 (1937) – Mary Curson
 Live, Love and Learn (1937) – Lily Chalmers
 In Name Only (1939) – Suzanne
 Married and in Love (1940) – Doris Wilding
 Curtain Call (1940) – Charlotte Morley
 Enemy Agent (1940) – Irene Hunter
 Beyond Tomorrow (1940) – Arlene Terry
 Torrid Zone (1940) – Gloria Anderson
 Bowery Boy (1940) – Peggy Winters
 Nothing But the Truth (1941) – Linda Graham
 Chip Off the Old Block (1944) – Glory Marlow Jr.
 The Lady and the Monster (1944) – Chloe Donovan
 Are These Our Parents? (1944) – Myra Salisbury
 The Thin Man Goes Home (1945) – Helena Draque (final film role)

References

External links 

Helen Vinson and Fred Perry New York Public Library Digital Gallery image (1935)

Helen Vinson at Virtual History

1907 births
1999 deaths
Actresses from Texas
American film actresses
American stage actresses
People from Beaumont, Texas
University of Texas at Austin alumni
20th-century American actresses